Topoli (Ukrainian: Топо́лі) is a village located in the Kupiansk Raion of the Kharkiv Oblast in Ukraine.

Geography 
The village is located in the Kupiansk Raion in the Kharkiv Oblast in eastern Ukraine. Up until 2020, it was part of the Dvorichna Raion, until it was merged with the Kupiansk Raion. It is located east of the river Oskil. It has an elevation of 107 meters. It is located 17 kilometers from Tavilzhanka, 21 kilometers from Dvorichna, 40 kilometers from Kivsharivka and 35 kilometers from Kupiansk.

History 
The village was founded in 1725.

On June 12, 2020, it became part of the Dvorychanska settlement community.

On July 17, 2020, after the liquidation and dissolution of the Drovichna Raion, it became part of the Kupiansk Raion.

The village was occupied by Russian troops on February 25, 2022.

References 

Villages in Kupiansk Raion